The Church of Nuestra Señora de la Concepción y San Fernando of Toa Alta (Spanish: Iglesia de Nuestra Señora de la Concepción y San Fernando de Toa Alta), better known as the Church of San Fernando of Toa Alta (Iglesia San Fernando de Toa Alta), is a historic Roman Catholic parish church located in the main town square (plaza pública) of Toa Alta Pueblo, the administrative and historic center of the municipality of Toa Alta, Puerto Rico.

The original church dates to 1752, but the building was remodeled in 1826.  It is a prime example of the churches built from 1720 to 1820 in Puerto Rico that have a single nave covered with a barrel vault. The church was added to the National Register of Historic Places (NRHP) on September 18, 1984. It is one of the 31 church buildings listed in the Puerto Rico State Historic Preservation Office's Inventory of the Historic Churches, and part of the Historic Churches of Puerto Rico MPS.

Gallery

See also 
 National Register of Historic Places listings in northern Puerto Rico

References 

Toa Alta, Puerto Rico
Roman Catholic churches completed in 1752
Churches completed in 1826
Churches on the National Register of Historic Places in Puerto Rico
1752 establishments in the Spanish West Indies
18th-century establishments in Puerto Rico
Roman Catholic churches in Puerto Rico